Scarborough is a seaside town situated within the City of Cape Town on the Cape Peninsula in the Western Cape province of South Africa, situated at the edge of the Cape Point Nature Reserve. The town's boundary includes Scarborough Beach, which is popular with surfers.

This town was designated as a conservation village in April 1996, defined as "a residential area of limited extent, surrounded by a conserved natural landscape, committed to reverse past environmental damage and to avoid future environmental impacts".

References

External links 
 Scarborough Conservation Group
 Cape Point Route Scarborough

Suburbs of Cape Town